The following outline is provided as an overview of and topical guide to the U.S. State of New York:

New York – U.S. state located on the Eastern seaboard and extending to the Great Lakes. Settled by the Dutch in the 17th century, New York was one of the original Thirteen Colonies.  About one third of all the battles of the Revolutionary War took place in New York. New York enacted its constitution in 1777 and was the eleventh state to ratify the United States Constitution, on July 26, 1788.  It is the fourth most populous state.

General reference 

 Names
 Common name: New York
 Official name: State of New York
 Abbreviations and name codes
 Postal symbol:  NY
 ISO 3166-2 code:  US-NY
 Internet second-level domain:  .ny.us
 Nicknames
  The Empire State (currently used on license plates)
 Adjectival: New York
 Demonym: New Yorker

Geography of New York 

Geography of New York
 New York is: a U.S. state, a federal state of the United States of America
 Location
 Northern hemisphere
 Western hemisphere
 Americas
 North America
 Anglo America
 Northern America
 United States of America
 Contiguous United States
 Canada–US border
 Eastern United States
 East Coast of the United States
 Northeastern United States
 Mid-Atlantic states
 Great Lakes Region
 Population of New York: 19,378,102  (2010 U.S. Census)
 Area of New York:
 Atlas of New York
 Places in New York
 National Historic Landmarks in New York
 National Register of Historic Places listings in New York
 Bridges on the National Register of Historic Places in New York
 National Natural Landmarks in New York
 State parks in New York

Environment of New York 
 Climate of New York
 State forests of New York
 Superfund sites in New York

Natural geographic features of New York 
 Lakes of New York
 Rivers of New York

Regions of New York 

 Downstate New York
 New York City
 Long Island
 Hudson Valley
 Upstate New York
 Capital District
 North Country
 Southern Tier
 Central New York
 Western New York

Administrative divisions of New York 

 The 62 Counties of the State of New York
 Cities in New York
 State capital of New York: Albany
 City nicknames in New York
 Sister cities in New York
 Towns in New York
 Census-designated places in New York

Demography of New York 

Demographics of New York

Government and politics of New York 

 Form of government: U.S. state government
 United States congressional delegations from New York
 New York State Capitol
 Elections in New York
 Electoral reform in New York
 Political party strength in New York

Executive branch of the government  of New York 

 Governor of New York
 Lieutenant Governor of New York
 Secretary of State of New York
 State departments
 New York State Department of Transportation

Legislative branch of the government  of New York 

 New York Legislature (bicameral)
 Upper house: New York State Senate
 Lower house: New York State Assembly

Judicial branch of the government of New York 

Courts of New York
 Supreme Court of New York

Law and order in New York 

Law of New York
 Cannabis in New York
 Capital punishment in New York
 Individuals executed in New York
 Constitution of New York
 Crime in New York
 Gun laws in New York
 Law enforcement in New York
 Law enforcement agencies in New York
 New York State Police
 Same-sex marriage in New York

Military of New York 

 New York Air National Guard
 New York Army National Guard

Local government in New York 

Local government in New York

History of New York 

History of New York

History of New York by period 
French colony of Canada, 1534–(1609–1763)
Dutch colony of Nieuw-Nederland, 1624–1652
History of slavery in New York, 1626–1827
Patroonship of Rensselaerswyck, 1630–1840s
Dutch province of Nieuw-Nederland, 1652–1664
English Province of New-York, 1664–1673
Third Anglo-Dutch War, 1672–1674
Netherlands military government of Nieuw-Nederland, 1673–1674
Treaty of Westminster of 1674
English Province of New-York, 1674–1688
English Dominion of New-England in America, 1688–1689
English Province of New-York, 1689–1707
British Province of New-York, 1707–1776
King George's War, 1740–1748
Treaty of Aix-la-Chapelle of 1748
French and Indian War, 1754–1763
Treaty of Paris of 1763
British Indian Reserve, 1763–1783
Royal Proclamation of 1763
American Revolutionary War, April 19, 1775 – September 3, 1783
Capture of Fort Ticonderoga, May 10, 1775
New York and New Jersey campaign, July 3, 1776 – July 26, 1777
United States Declaration of Independence, July 4, 1776
Saratoga campaign, June 14 – October 17, 1777
Siege of Fort Ticonderoga, July 2–6, 1777
Battles of Saratoga, September 19 – October 7, 1777
Treaty of Paris, September 3, 1783
State of New York since 1776
Third state to ratify the Articles of Confederation and Perpetual Union, signed July 9, 1778
Western territorial claims ceded 1782
Eleventh State to ratify the Constitution of the United States of America on July 26, 1788
War of 1812, June 18, 1812 – March 23, 1815
Battle of Plattsburgh, 1814
Treaty of Ghent, December 24, 1814
Martin Van Buren becomes 8th President of the United States on March 4, 1837
Mexican–American War, April 25, 1846 – February 2, 1848
Millard Fillmore becomes 13th President of the United States on July 9, 1850
American Civil War, April 12, 1861 – May 13, 1865
New York in the American Civil War, 1861–1865
Chester A. Arthur becomes 21st President of the United States on September 19, 1881
Grover Cleveland becomes 22nd President of the United States on March 4, 1885
Grover Cleveland also becomes 24th President of the United States on March 4, 1893
Spanish–American War, April 25 – August 12, 1898
Assassination of President William McKinley in Buffalo on September 6, 1901
President McKinley dies in Buffalo on September 14, 1901
Vice President (and former Governor) Theodore Roosevelt becomes 26th President of the United States on September 14, 1901
Former Governor Franklin Delano Roosevelt becomes 32nd President of the United States on March 4, 1933

History of New York by region 

 By city
 History of New York City
 History of Buffalo, New York

History of New York by subject 
 History of slavery in New York

Culture of New York 
 Museums in New York
 Religion in New York
 The Church of Jesus Christ of Latter-day Saints in New York
 Episcopal Diocese of New York
 Scouting in New York
 State symbols of New York
 Flag of the State of New York 
 Great Seal of the State of New York

The Arts in New York 
 Music of New York
 Theater in New York

Sports in New York 

Sports in New York

Economy and infrastructure of New York 

Economy of New York
 Media:
 Newspapers in New York
 Radio stations in New York
 Television stations in New York
 Hospitals in New York
 Transportation in New York
 Airports in New York
 Roads in New York
 Interstate Highways in New York
 State highways in New York

Education in New York 

Education in New York
 Schools in New York
 School districts in New York
 High schools in New York
 Colleges and universities in New York
 University of the State of New York
 State University of New York

See also

Bibliography of New York
Topic overview:
New York

Index of New York-related articles
Bibliography of New York

References

External links

New York
New York